Savage Tales is the title of three American comics series. Two were black-and-white comics-magazine anthologies published by Marvel Comics, and the other a color comic book anthology published by Dynamite Entertainment.

Publication history

Marvel
The first of the two volumes of Savage Tales ran 11 issues, with a nearly 2-year hiatus after the premiere issue (May 1971, then Oct. 1973 - July 1975).  It marked Marvel's second attempt at entering the comics-magazine field dominated by Warren Publishing (Creepy, Eerie, Vampirella), following the two-issue superhero entry The Spectacular Spider-Man in 1968. Starring in the first issue were:
 Robert E. Howard's sword and sorcery pulp-fiction character Conan the Barbarian, adapted by writer Roy Thomas and artist Barry Windsor-Smith (as Barry Smith)
 the futuristic, Amazon-like Femizons, by writer-editor Stan Lee and artist John Romita
 the first-ever appearance of the swamp creature Man-Thing, plotted by Lee and Thomas, scripted by Gerry Conway and drawn by Gray Morrow
 the African-American inner-city defender Joshua, in the feature "Black Brother" by Dennis O'Neil (under the pseudonym Sergius O'Shaughnessy) and penciler Gene Colan
  the jungle lord Ka-Zar, by Lee and artist John Buscema.

Thomas, who would shortly thereafter become Marvel editor-in-chief, recalled in 2008 that:

When the magazine eventually began publishing again years later (after Goodman had left the company) in the wake of a Conan-inspired sword-and-sorcery trend in comics, it starred the likes of Conan; fellow Robert E. Howard hero Kull of Atlantis; and John Jakes' barbarian creation, Brak. As of issue #6, the magazine cover-featured Ka-Zar.

The series featured painted covers by comics artists including John Buscema (#1-2), Pablo Marcos & John Romita (#3), Neal Adams (#4-6), Boris Vallejo (#7, #10), and Michael Kaluta (#9). A 1975 annual, consisting entirely of reprints, mostly from Ka-Zar's color-comics series, sported a new cover by Ken Barr.

Volume 2 ran eight issues (Oct 1985 - Dec. 1986). It featured adventure and action stories with a military fiction slant. Stories in the first and fourth issues, a feature called "5th to the 1st" by writer Doug Murray and artist Michael Golden, were the forerunners of the duo's color-comics series The 'Nam.

Dynamite Entertainment
In 2007, American publisher Dynamite Entertainment  started a new Savage Tales, a color comic book sword and sorcery anthology starring the character Red Sonja.

Footnotes

References

Marvel Comics titles
Dynamite Entertainment titles
1971 comics debuts
Comics by Archie Goodwin (comics)
Comics by Doug Moench
Comics by Gerry Conway
Comics by Roy Thomas
Defunct American comics
Fantasy comics
Horror comics
Comics anthologies